The 2016 San Diego Toreros football team represented the University of San Diego during the 2016 NCAA Division I FCS football season. They were led by fourth-year head coach Dale Lindsey and played their home games at Torero Stadium. They were a member of the Pioneer Football League. They finished the season 10–2, 8–0 in PFL play to be crowned PFL champions and earned the PFL's automatic bid to the FCS Playoffs, where they defeated Cal Poly in the first round, before losing in the second round to North Dakota State.

Schedule

Roster

Game summaries

Western New Mexico

At Cal Poly

Dayton

At Butler

Davidson

At Drake

Valparaiso

At Marist

Universidad De Las Americas Puebla

This was an exhibition game and had no effect on San Diego's overall record.

Stetson

At Campbell

FCS playoffs

First round – Cal Poly

Second round – North Dakota State

Ranking movements

References

San Diego
San Diego Toreros football seasons
Pioneer Football League champion seasons
San Diego
San Diego Toreros football